The Local Government (Scotland) Act 1973 (c. 65) is an Act of Parliament of the United Kingdom that altered local government in Scotland on 16 May 1975.

The Act followed and largely implemented the report of the Royal Commission on Local Government in Scotland in 1969 (the Wheatley Report), and it made the most far-reaching changes to Scottish local government in centuries. It swept away the counties, burghs and districts established by the Local Government (Scotland) Act 1947, which were largely based on units of local government dating from the Middle Ages, and replaced them with a uniform two-tier system of regional and district councils (except in the islands, which were given unitary, all-purpose councils).

In England and Wales, the Local Government Act 1972 established a similar system of two-tier administrative county and district councils.

The Act
The Act abolished previous existing local government structures and created a two-tier system of regions and districts on the mainland and a unitary system in the islands. The former counties remained in use for land registration purposes.

The Act also established the Local Government Boundary Commission for Scotland, with the remit to make proposals to the Secretary of State for effecting changes which it thought desirable in the interests of effective and convenient local government. The Act also abolished the use of Fiars Prices for valuing grain.

The new local government areas

Regions

Island areas

Districts

Several districts were later renamed: Merrick becoming Wigtown, Argyll to Argyll and Bute, Bishopbriggs and Kirkintilloch to Strathkelvin, Cumbernauld to Cumbernauld and Kilsyth, and Lanark to Clydesdale.

Reaction and aftermath
Unlike the 1972 Local Government Act in England and Wales, the 1973 Act in Scotland used the term  for the upper tier of the two-tier system. This has caused far less confusion over the identity of the counties in Scotland. Despite the Act stipulating that the regions, not counties, should be shown on Ordnance Survey maps, the counties still enjoy wide public recognition. Even though they no longer play any direct part in local government, counties are used in many other systems. The Royal Mail continued to use them as postal counties, and the Watsonian vice-counties, registration counties and many of the Lieutenancy areas of Scotland are based on them.

However, the sheer size of some regions meant that it became cumbersome to administer all functions on a region-wide basis. By 1977 Strathclyde Regional Council had established unelected sub-Regional Councils, which resembled the County Councils that the Regional Council had replaced.

The two-tier system of local government introduced by the act lasted until 1 April 1996 when the Local Government etc. (Scotland) Act 1994 came into effect, abolishing the regions and districts and replacing them with 32 unitary authorities.

Further reading
 Pugh, Michael, 'Centralism versus localism? Democracy versus efficiency? The perennial challenges of Scottish local government organisation' (30 June 2014), History & Policy, http://www.historyandpolicy.org/policy-papers/papers/the-perennial-challenges-of-scottish-local-government-organisation

See also
Local Government etc. (Scotland) Act 1994
Subdivisions of Scotland

References

Local Government (Scotland) Act 1973.
Royal Commission on Local Government in Scotland, 1969.

Acts of the Parliament of the United Kingdom concerning Scotland
History of local government in Scotland
United Kingdom Acts of Parliament 1973
 
1973 in Scotland
October 1973 events in the United Kingdom